Man of War is a 1997 real-time strategic naval combat video game developed by Strategy First and published by Virgin Interactive Entertainment for MS-DOS compatible operating systems and Microsoft Windows. A sequel, Man of War II: Chains of Command, was released in 1999.

Plot and gameplay 
Players complete naval battles through a series of historical scenarios. The games included a character creator, and a scenario editor.

Development 
The game was developed by the small studio Strategy First (established in 1991), and would become one of its flagship series. Man of War was released December 31, 1997, while the sequel was released December 31, 1999. On June 17, 1997, Virgin Interactive signed a distribution agreement with Strategy First for North and South America; as part of the deal Virgin Interactive would  also distribute two additional titles from Strategy First.

Reception
CD Mag felt the game took players to places they had never been before, though described it as a "pretty straightforward classic wargame with a new-fangled wrapper".  Game Revolution said that while the game sounds good on paper it falls flat in its execution. The game sold 30,000 copies by April 1999.ref name="Copies"></ref>

Legacy 
Man of War II was released in North America in 1999 by GT Interactive.

References

External links 
Man of War at Strategy First (archived)
Man of War II at Strategy First (archived)

1997 video games
DOS games
Real-time strategy video games
Video games developed in Canada
Windows games
Naval video games